Malaysia competed in the 1990 Commonwealth Games held in Auckland, New Zealand from 24 January to 3 February 1990.

Medal summary

Medals by sport

Medallists

Athletics

Men
Track event

Field event

Women
Track event

Key
Note–Ranks given for track events are within the athlete's heat only
Q = Qualified for the next round
q = Qualified for the next round as a fastest loser or, in field events, by position without achieving the qualifying target
NR = National record
N/A = Round not applicable for the event
Bye = Athlete not required to compete in round

Badminton

Cycling

Road

Track
Points race

Swimming

Men

References

Malaysia at the Commonwealth Games
Nations at the 1990 Commonwealth Games
1990 in Malaysian sport